Gulume Tollesa Chala (born 11 September 1992) is an Ethiopian long-distance runner.

Career 

In 2013 she won the Marrakech Marathon. In 2015 she won the Frankfurt Marathon.

In 2017 and 2018 she won the Hong Kong Marathon. In 2018 she also set a new course record 2:29:37. This record did not stand for long as Volha Mazuronak set a new record of 2:26:13 in the following year.

Achievements

References

External links 

 

Living people
1992 births
Place of birth missing (living people)
Ethiopian female long-distance runners
Ethiopian female marathon runners
21st-century Ethiopian women